Rayane Rachid (born 28 July 1994) is a Lebanese footballer who plays as a midfielder for Lebanese club ÓBerytus. She is also a futsal player who plays as a defender, and represented Lebanon internationally in both football and futsal.

Early life 
Born on 28 July 1994, in Jdaideh, Lebanon, Rachid is Muslim.

Club career 
Rachid has played for Zouk Mosbeh and ÓBerytus in the Lebanese Women's Football League.

International career
Rachid has been capped for Lebanon at senior level in both football and futsal. In football, she represented Lebanon in multiple competitions, namely the 2014 AFC Women's Asian Cup qualification in 2013, where she played two games, and the Aphrodite Women Cup in 2015, where she played three games.

In futsal, Rachid played for Lebanon at the AFC Women's Futsal Championship in 2018.

See also
 List of Lebanon women's international footballers

References

1994 births
Living people
People from Matn District
Lebanese women's footballers
Women's association football midfielders
Zouk Mosbeh SC footballers
ÓBerytus players
Lebanese Women's Football League players
Lebanon women's international footballers
Lebanese women's futsal players
Futsal defenders
Lebanese Muslims